Alexander Mitscherlich may refer to:

 Alexander Mitscherlich (chemist) (1836–1918), German chemist
 Alexander Mitscherlich (psychologist) (1908–1982), German psychoanalyst